

Overview before the season
24 teams joined the league, including two relegated from the 1941–42 La Liga and 3 promoted from Divisiones Regionales.

Relegated from La Liga
Hércules
Real Sociedad

Promoted from Divisiones Regionales'''
Cultural Leonesa
Tarrasa
Alcoyano

Group 1

Teams

League table

Results

Top goalscorers

Top goalkeepers

Group 2

Teams

League table

Results

Top goalscorers

Top goalkeepers

Group 3

Teams

League table

Results

Top goalscorers

Top goalkeepers

Promotion playoffs

First round

League table

Second round

Relegation playoffs

First round

Group 1

League table

Results

Group 2

League table

Results

Group 3

League table

Results

Group 4

League table

Group 5

League table

Group 6

League table

Second round

Group 1

League table

Results

Group 2

League table

Results

External links
BDFútbol

Segunda División seasons
2
Spain